The Coughlin House is a historic house at 260 West Main Street in Carthage, South Dakota.  It is a -story wood-frame structure with a gable roof.  Its main (southern) facade has a centered shed-roof porch supported by spindled columns, with jigsaw-cut balustrade and trim.  The house was built in 1898 by James Coughlin, an Irish immigrant, and is a well-preserved local example of Folk Victorian architecture.

The house was listed on the National Register of Historic Places in 2006.

References

Houses on the National Register of Historic Places in South Dakota
Houses completed in 1898
Houses in Miner County, South Dakota
National Register of Historic Places in Miner County, South Dakota